The Xiangfen West railway station  is a railway station of Datong–Xi'an Passenger Railway that is located in Xiangfen County, Shanxi, China. It started operation on July 1, 2014, together with the railway.

Railway stations in China opened in 2014
Railway stations in Shanxi